Parry Sound District is a census division of the Canadian province of Ontario.  Its boundaries are District of Muskoka to the south, the Sudbury District to the north-northwest, the French River and Lake Nipissing in the north, Nipissing District and North Bay in the north and east and parts of Algonquin Park in the northeast.

In 2016, the population was 42,824.

It is geographically in Southern Ontario, but the Ontario and federal governments administer it as part of Northern Ontario. Like other census divisions in Northern Ontario, it does not have an incorporated county, regional municipality, or district municipality level of government but instead serves as a purely territorial division like the other districts of Northern Ontario. Instead of an upper tier of municipal administration, all government services in the district are provided either by the local municipalities or by the provincial government itself. Some communities which are not part of any incorporated municipality are served by local services boards. The district is also included in the service areas of FedNor and the Northern Ontario Heritage Fund. Accordingly, in most administrative contexts the division is grouped with the Northern Ontario region instead of Southern Ontario which is mainly geographic.

Along with the neighbouring Muskoka and Haliburton regions, the Parry Sound District is considered part of Ontario's cottage country, which is geographically in the primary region of Southern Ontario and the secondary region of Central Ontario. The district is commonly divided into two subregions; West Parry Sound and East Parry Sound, the latter often referred to as the Almaguin Highlands.

Subdivisions
Communities within these subdivisions are added in parentheses

Towns

Townships

Villages

Unorganized Areas

First Nation Reserves

Original geographic townships

Demographics

Forest fire protection history

The Parry Sound Forest Fire District was founded by Ontario's former Department of Lands and Forests (now the MNR) in 1922 as one of 17 districts to help protect Ontario's forests from fire by early detection from fire towers. The headquarters for the district were housed in the town of Parry Sound. It was the central location for 21 fire tower lookouts, including the Parry Sound fire tower, which was erected in the same location as the modern lookout tower at 17 George Street. The other 20 towers in the district were: Pickerel River CPR, Byng Inlet, Still River, Pointe au Baril, Pakesley, Pickerel River CNR, Key Junction, Ardbeg, Spence, Go Home, Loring, Stormy Lake (Restoule), Nipissing, Boulter, Lount, Laurier, Strong, Proudfoot, Stisted and Draper. When a fire was spotted in the forest a towerman would get the degree bearings from his respective tower and radio back the information to headquarters. When one or more towermen from other towers in the area would also call in their bearings, the forest rangers at headquarters could get a 'triangulation' read and plot the exact location of the fire on their map. This way a team of forest firefighters could be dispatched as soon as possible to get the fire under control. In 1969 there remained only 4 actively staffed towers: Ardbeg, Go Home, Stormy Lake, and Boulter. These would all be phased out shortly after when aerial fire fighting techniques were employed in the 1970s.

See also
 Canadian census divisions
 Central Ontario
 Almaguin Highlands
 List of secondary schools in Ontario#Parry Sound District

References

External links

 Parry Sound Tourism
 The Parry Sound Area Chamber of Commerce
 Parry Sound and Area information 
 Map of Parry Sound District showing its municipalities
 Rooted in Stone: Reflections on West Parry Sound's Past
 Almaguin Highlands Ontario East Parry Sound's Almaguin Highlands Regional Portal
 Almaguin Highlands Digital Collection A service of Knowledge Ontario